CH-14 was a  of the Imperial Japanese Navy during World War II.

History
CH-14 was laid down by Tama Shipbuilding at its Okajima shipyard on 6 June 1940, launched on 29 November 1940, and completed and commissioned on 31 March 1941. 

On 28 July 1945, she was attacked by aircraft from Vice Admiral John S. McCain Sr.'s Task Force 38 which resulted in her being beached near Yokosuka (at ) where she remained until the end of World War II.  CH-14 was struck from the Navy List on 30 November 1945 and scrapped soon after.

References

Additional references

1941 ships
No.13-class submarine chasers